Edgerton is a city in Johnson County, Kansas, United States, and part of the Kansas City metropolitan area.  As of the 2020 census, the population of the city was 1,748.  It is home to a large BNSF intermodal train facility named Logistics Park Kansas City.

History
Edgerton was founded in 1870 when the railroad was extended to that point. It was named for the chief engineer of the Atchison, Topeka and Santa Fe Railway.

In October 2010, BNSF Railway announced plans to build its new 443-acre $250 million intermodal shipping facility in Edgerton, and after completion will replace the current one in Kansas City, Kansas. It officially opened in October 2013. When the logistics park is fully built out, according to its 1,550-acre master plan, its capacity at that point will be 1.5 million containers annually.

Geography
Edgerton is located at  (38.763639, -95.010239).

Demographics

2010 census
As of the census of 2010, there were 1,671 people, 591 households, and 450 families living in the city. The racial makeup of the city was 93.7% White, 0.8% African American, 0.6% Native American, 0.3% Asian, 0.8% from other races, and 3.8% from two or more races. Hispanic or Latino of any race were 4.3% of the population.

There were 591 households, of which 42.8% had children under the age of 18 living with them, 58.4% were married couples living together, 12.7% had a female householder with no husband present, 5.1% had a male householder with no wife present, and 23.9% were non-families. 18.3% of all households were made up of individuals, and 3.7% had someone living alone who was 65 years of age or older. The average household size was 2.83 and the average family size was 3.25.

The median age in the city was 32.1 years. 29.3% of residents were under the age of 18; 8.4% were between the ages of 18 and 24; 31.4% were from 25 to 44; 24.8% were from 45 to 64; and 6.2% were 65 years of age or older. The gender makeup of the city was 52.8% male and 47.2% female.

2000 census
As of the census of 2000, there were 1,440 people, 474 households, and 388 families living in the city. The racial makeup of the city was 95.97% White, 0.35% African American, 1.46% Native American, 0.21% Asian, 0.07% from other races, and 1.94% from two or more races. Hispanic or Latino of any race were 2.22% of the population. 23.5% were of German, 21.2% American, 14.5% Irish and 10.3% English ancestry according to Census 2000.

There were 474 households, out of which 50.6% had children under the age of 18 living with them, 66.0% were married couples living together, 10.1% had a female householder with no husband present, and 18.1% were non-families. 11.8% of all households were made up of individuals, and 2.7% had someone living alone who was 65 years of age or older. The average household size was 3.03 and the average family size was 3.31.

In the city, the population was spread out, with 33.0% under the age of 18, 11.4% from 18 to 24, 35.9% from 25 to 44, 16.0% from 45 to 64, and 3.7% who were 65 years of age or older. The median age was 28 years. For every 100 females, there were 112.4 males. For every 100 females age 18 and over, there were 104.4 males.

The median income for a household in the city was $50,179, and the median income for a family was $51,213. Males had a median income of $32,041 versus $23,594 for females. The per capita income for the city was $16,911. About 2.3% of families and 3.0% of the population were below the poverty line, including 4.6% of those under age 18 and none of those age 65 or over.

Libraries
The Johnson County Library system includes 13 locations throughout Johnson County, including the Edgerton Library.

Notable people
Notable individuals who were born in and/or have lived in Edgerton include:
 John Henry Balch (1896-1980), U.S. Naval Reserve Commander, Medal of Honor recipient

See also
 Hillsdale Lake and Hillsdale State Park
 Santa Fe Trail

References

Further reading

External links

 City of Edgerton
 Edgerton - Directory of Public Officials
 Edgerton city map, KDOT

Cities in Kansas
Cities in Johnson County, Kansas